Bluebeard is a 1951 comedy film directed by Christian-Jaque and starring Hans Albers, Cécile Aubry and Fritz Kortner. It is based on the fairy tale Bluebeard by Charles Perrault. It was made as a co-production between West Germany, France and Switzerland. It was made using the Gevacolor process. A separate French-language version Barbe-Bleue was also made.

Cast
 Hans Albers as Blaubart
 Cécile Aubry as Aline
 Fritz Kortner as Haushofsmeister
 Lina Carstens as Amme
 Arno Paulsen as Matthes
 Jacques Sernas as Florian
 Ina Halley as Anna
 Henri Rollan as Freiherr d'Etioles
 Denise Cormand as Valentine d'Etioles
 Carl Wery as Herzog
 Reggie Nalder as Captain of the guard
 Elly Claus as Kunigunde, die Deutsche
 Diane Lefort as Lucrezia, die Italienerin
 Espanita Cortez as Mercedes, die Spanierin
 Geneviève Gérald as Lady Anny Fling, die Schottin
 Phung Thi Nghiep as Tschao Ming Kuong, die Chinesin
 Leila Fouad as Fatme, die Araberin
 Georges Chamarat
 Aziza Néri
 Fernand Fabre
 Fred Barius

References

Bibliography 
 Zipes, Jack. The Enchanted Screen: The Unknown History of Fairy-Tale Films. Routledge, 2011.

External links 
 

1951 films
1950s black comedy films
French black comedy films
German black comedy films
Swiss comedy films
West German films
1950s German-language films
Films directed by Christian-Jaque
German serial killer films
Films set in the Middle Ages
Films set in the 15th century
German multilingual films
French multilingual films
Films based on Bluebeard
1950s multilingual films
Films set in Europe
1951 comedy films
1951 drama films
1950s German films
1950s French films